Professor Leeanne Carey is a world leading Australian neuroscientist in occupational therapy and stroke rehabilitation and recovery research. She is the founding leader of the Neurorehabilitation and Recovery research group in the Stroke division at the Florey Institute of Neuroscience and Mental Health in Melbourne, Australia, and currently holds a Future Fellowship awarded by the Australian Research Council (ARC).

Early life and education 
Leeanne Carey graduated high school from Chavoin College in Melbourne in 1977, where she was awarded Dux of School and Special Distinction in the Higher School Certificate English exam.

Carey began her tertiary education at the Lincoln Institute of Health Sciences, where she graduated with a Bachelor of Applied Sciences in Occupational Therapy (BAppSc(OT)) in 1987. In 1993, Carey became the first person in Australia to complete a Doctor of Philosophy (PhD) in Occupational Therapy through La Trobe University. Her PhD thesis investigated training effects and quantitative measurement of tactile and proprioceptive discrimination loss after stroke, which was successfully passed without revision.

Work

1981-1990 
Prior to beginning her full-time PhD candidature in 1990, Carey worked as a Grade 1 Occupational Therapist at the Manvantara Geriatric Rehabilitation Hospital between 1981 and 1983. Between 1983 and 1989, she was appointed as a Senior Tutor for undergraduate classes in the School of Occupational Therapy at the Lincoln Institute of Health Sciences. In 1987, Carey was promoted to a Lecturer position in the Lincoln School of Health Sciences at La Trobe University shortly after the two institutes had merged. In 1989, Carey was appointed Chief Occupational Therapist at the Hampton Rehabilitation Hospital where she worked for one year.

1993-2014 present 
For the next two decades following the completion of her PhD, Carey worked her way up the academic ladder from multiple post-doctoral fellowships to founding her own research lab in Neurorehabilitation and Recovery Research in the Stroke Division at the National Stroke Research Institute in 2004, which was later transferred to the Florey Institute of Neuroscience and Mental Health. She was awarded Research Fellowships from institutions including the Australian Research Council, National Stroke Research Institute, Brain Research Institute, and the Australian National Health and Medical Research Council (NHMRC).

In 2004, Carey was appointed Adjunct Professor for the Department of Occupational Therapy at La Trobe University and in 2013 became a member of the Faculty of Health Sciences Research Committee of the university. In 2010 was appointed to the Faculty of the Florey Institute. In addition, in 2013 she was elected to the Australian Academy of Science and at the same time was elected the Chair of the Inaugural Australian Occupational Therapy Research Foundation.

As of November 2014, Carey's Neurorehabilitation and Recovery research lab has grown to a team of 24 researchers, including 1 post-doc, 6 research staff, 10 affiliates, and 7 students from disciplines ranging from occupational therapy, physiotherapy, neurology, psychology and neuroscience.

Research focus 
Leeanne Carey's primary focus encompasses four main areas of research: 1) Investigating restorative approaches to stroke rehabilitation; 2) Understanding the nature of sensorimotor impairment and impact on function; 3) Targeting of rehabilitation through novel brain imaging and biomarkers; and 4) Studying the impact of depression and cognition on stroke recovery and participation. Carey's approaches to stroke rehabilitation are primarily based on theories of neural plasticity and learning and empirically tested for clinical and neuroanatomical outcomes. Her research lab utilises Magnetic Resonance Imaging (MRI) tools to study dynamic changes in the brain in order to better understand mechanisms of recovery and optimise rehabilitation methods to survivors of stroke. A recent focus of her research has centred on the impact of cognition and depression on stroke recovery and utilising novel brain imaging tools and biomarkers for optimal targeting of rehabilitation post-stroke.

Competitive funding 
During her career, Carey has received research funding from competitive grants schemes that have totalled to over $8.8 million AUD.

Publications 
Professor Carey has over 75 peer-reviewed publications with over 1200 career citations. From 2009-2014 she published 45 articles that have over 800 citations. In 2012 she was invited to edit the book 'Stroke Rehabilitation: Insights from Neuroscience and Imaging'.

Personal 

Leeanne Carey currently resides in Melbourne, Australia, and is happily married with two children.

Awards and honors 

 2013: World Federation of Neurological Rehabilitation Franz Gerstenbrand Award (nomination under review).
 2013: Nominated, Victoria prize for science and innovation
 2013: Chair, inaugural Occupational Therapy Australia Research Foundation.
 2013: International Visiting Professor, University of Haifa, Israel.
 2011: International Visiting Professor, Washington University School of Medicine, St. Louis, USA.
 2010: Honored by the World Federation for Neurorehabilitation (WFNR). (Neurorehabil Neural Repair, 2010;24:499-500).
 2010: BrainLink Women of Achievement Award (finalist).
 2009: Inducted to the Academy of Research of the American Occupational Therapy Foundation for ‘exemplary and distinguished contributions towards the science of occupational Therapy.
 2009: Australian Research Council (ARC) Future Fellowship
 2004-2008: National Health and Medical Research Council (NHMRC) of Australia Career Development Award.
 1995: La Trobe University, Faculty of Health Sciences Postdoctoral Research Fellowship.
 1994: La Trobe University, Faculty of Health Sciences Research Grant for post-doctoral studies.
 1991: Australian Association of Occupational Therapists Research Award
 1990: Australian Postgraduate Research Award.
 1988: World Federation of Occupational Therapists Foundation Research Award (only one award is awarded worldwide every four years).
 1988: La Trobe University Postgraduate Scholarship.
 1981: Special commendation for grades obtained in final year of study, School of Occupational Therapy, La Trobe University.
 1977: Dux of School, Chavoin College, Melbourne, Australia. Special Distinction, Higher School Certificate English exam.

References

Australian Women of Neuroscience 2014
Australian neuroscientists
Australian women neuroscientists
Occupational therapists
Living people
1959 births